Moncks Bay is a south-eastern suburb of Christchurch, New Zealand.

He also had  of land on the hills behind. Heath sold the land to William McCormack in 1860; McCormacks Bay in the adjacent suburb Mount Pleasant is named for his brother. Moncks Bay changed owner again in 1868, and was purchased in 1869 by John Stanley Monck, after whom the area was named.

Demographics
Moncks Bay is part of the Clifton Hill SA2 statistical area.

It had a population of 486 at the 2018 New Zealand census, an increase of 3 people (0.6%) since the 2013 census, and an increase of 21 people (4.5%) since the 2006 census. There were 198 households. There were 228 males and 255 females, giving a sex ratio of 0.89 males per female, with 105 people (21.6%) aged under 15 years, 63 (13.0%) aged 15 to 29, 204 (42.0%) aged 30 to 64, and 114 (23.5%) aged 65 or older.

Ethnicities were 95.7% European/Pākehā, 6.8% Māori, 0.6% Pacific peoples, 3.7% Asian, and 0.6% other ethnicities (totals add to more than 100% since people could identify with multiple ethnicities).

Although some people objected to giving their religion, 54.3% had no religion, 38.3% were Christian and 1.9% had other religions.

Of those at least 15 years old, 162 (42.5%) people had a bachelor or higher degree, and 33 (8.7%) people had no formal qualifications. The employment status of those at least 15 was that 174 (45.7%) people were employed full-time, 75 (19.7%) were part-time, and 9 (2.4%) were unemployed.

Notes

References

Suburbs of Christchurch